Cayo North East is an electoral constituency in the Cayo District represented in the House of Representatives of the National Assembly of Belize since 2015 by Orlando Habet of the People's United Party.

Profile

Cayo North East includes the northern part of San Ignacio, as well as the villages of Santa Familia, Spanish Lookout, Billy White, Esperanza, Duck Run I, Duck Run II, and Duck Run III.

Along with Belmopan, the Cayo North East constituency was created for the 2008 general election. In June 2014 San Ignacio mayor John August was named the UDP candidate for the 2015 general election, replacing embattled Area Representative Elvin Penner, who was re-elected in 2012 by a razor-thin margin and faced a recall drive shortly thereafter. The PUP nominated Orlando Habet, who went on to win the election in November.

Area Representatives

Elections

References

Belizean House constituencies established in 2008
Political divisions in Belize
Cayo North East